Ragi may refer to:
 Finger millet, plant producing edible grain
 Ragi (Sikhism), a Sikh person skilled in performing ragas
 Saccharomyces cerevisiae, a yeast also known as ragi yeast